Gail Beggs was deputy minister of the environment in Ontario, Canada.

References

Living people
Year of birth missing (living people)
Place of birth missing (living people)
Ontario civil servants